The Australian Natives' Association (ANA)  was a mutual society founded in Melbourne, Australia in April 1871. It was founded by and for the benefit of native-born white Australians and membership was restricted exclusively to that group.

The Association's objectives were to "raise funds by subscription, donations ... for the purpose of relieving sick members, and defraying expenses of funeral of members and their wives, relieving distressed widows and orphans and for the necessary expenses of the general management of the Society."

The organisation had 95,000 members in 1976 and provided benefits to 250,000 people, members and their families. While the ANA was legally required to have no affiliation with any political party, it was socially active. It provided strong support for the Federation of Australia, sport, afforestation, social well-being and the Federal Government's restricted immigration policy, later referred to as the White Australia policy. The ANA and Manchester Unity agreed to merge to form Australian Unity in 1990. After the merger, social and educative functions continue in the ANA Fraternal organisation. The last remaining branch of the ANA closed in 2007 in Western Australia.

Background

The formation of the Australian Natives Association was a multi stage process. It comes after the creation of the six Australian colonies, the discovery of significant quantities of gold with the wealth that brought and the increasing number of locally born citizens. The initial idea was to form a Friendly Society to provide help in sickness and distress solely for Melbourne born citizens.

"Melbourne Natives" desirous of forming society for the protection and promotion of their interests are requested to attend a meeting Monday evening, 8 o'clock, Grimwood's Hotel, Elizabeth St. Formation of a Society.

Victorian Natives' Association 
The 24 April 1871 meeting had 14 men in attendance who resolved to form a Friendly Society of Victorian Natives. A committee was formed and after a number of committee meetings and another public meeting, registration as a Friendly Society was gained on 4 May 1871. At the 5 June meeting it was agreed the objects were "To promote the social and intellectual improvement of its members".

ANA Day

Around the end of the 19th century, the Victorian association advocated for a kind of forerunner of what is today Australia Day, to be celebrated on January 26 as a public holiday and the national day. This subsequently became known as ANA Day in Victoria, but was not taken up by the other states until 1935, and renamed Australia Day.

Australian Natives' Association 
In 1872 it was voted to extend membership to men born in the other Australian colonies and changed its name at the same time.  The association started to grow and form new Branches initially around Melbourne and then in the golds fields towns of Ballarat and Sandhurst (now Bendigo) in 1874 and Neangor (now Eaglehawk) 1976.  In 1978 the Sandhurst branch initiated a motion that the Association allow having debates or essays at the meetings after the business had been completed.  The membership population centre of the Association moved to the gold fields towns west of Melbourne as the membership of these branches grew. The administration also moved West with th election of F. C. Wainwright, a member in Ballarat, as General Secretary in 1881. In as the Association grew, it was decided in 1890 to move administration  back to Melbourne. The Association played a leading role in the movement for Australian federation in the last 20 years of the 19th century. In 1900 it had a membership of 17,000, mainly in Victoria.

The ANA provided sickness, medical and funeral cover. Membership in the ANA was restricted to men born in Australia, at a time when Australian-born people of European descent (not including Indigenous Australians) were rising to power in place of an older generation born in Britain. In the 1890s, for the first time, the native born became the majority of the population.

The organisation received criticism for their name, including from Aboriginal leader and activist William Cooper over the appropriation of the term 'native'.

Chief Presidents

With the establishment of a growing number of branches including some outside Melbourne a conference was held in 1874 to plan for centralised administration of the ANA. From 1877 the ANA was placed under the control of a board of directors to be presided over by a chief president. From 1877 onwards the ANA elected a chief president at their annual conference held at different cities each year. There were four instances when the conference was not annual and the Chief President served for two years — the first two terms and twice due to the Second World War.

New Zealand Natives' Association 
With the 1880 public consideration of Australian colonies and New Zealand federating there was discussion of forming a New Zealand branch of the ANA. The Victorian ANA Board of Directors considered forming branches in Wellington, Westport, and Auckland New Zealand but the legislative hurdles caused by the differing legislation in the two colonies were insurmountable. A separate organisation, the New Zealand Natives Association (NZNA) was formed 30 April 1897. The Wellington branch grew satisfactorily reaching 245 members within a year. At its peak it reached 2,500 members. In 1900 while The Australian federation was not to include New Zealand, the New Zealand Natives Association voted to allow Australians to become members. Apart from differing legislation, limitations in communications technologies of the time made thoughts of amalgamating ANA and NZNA impractical. 1904 the Wellington Branch experienced significant difficulties and despite the offer from Victorian ANA to support it as if it were one of their own branches, the Wellington Branch disbanded in June 1905. The ANA meet the deficiency of £8/10/- so all creditors were paid. Over the next twenty or so years several attempts were made to align New Zealand branches with the ANA, but all failed.

Federation

In 1885 the ANA committed itself to the federation of the Australian colonies, in response to what was seen as the threat of foreign incursion into the Pacific. The organisation avoided party politics, but they soon adopted the rising liberal politician and ANA member Alfred Deakin as their candidate for leadership of the federal movement. The membership certificate of 1891 shows many of the emblems of federation such as the Australian Flag, the words, Prosperity, Unity, Peace and Federation, a globe of the world showing Australia as a single entity, self sufficiency through successful industry and ANA coat of arms featuring the kangaroo and emu.

In 1891, when the Victorian Parliament was considering the federation bill, the ANA organised public meetings around the colony to rally support for the bill, many of them addressed by Deakin. The ANA continued to campaign following the failure of the 1891 bill. From 1893 the association provided much of the organisational and financial support for the Federation Leagues which led the campaign, particularly in Victoria. When the movement revived after 1897, the ANA campaigned for the referendums to approve the proposed constitution. With federation achieved in 1901, the ANA withdrew from political activity, although it continued other activities such as promoting the observance of Australia Day. Other national issues supported by the ANA included afforestation, an Australian-made goods policy, water conservation, the celebration of 'proper and meaningful' citizenship ceremonies following the increased levels of migration after World War II, and the adoption of the wattle as the national floral emblem in 1912.

Female membership

The ANA was wary of admitting female members, on the basis that at the time males were predominately the primary income earners. At the 1896 Daylesford Conference the Clifton Hill branch presented a motion instructing the Board to take steps for form a Friendly Society similar to the ANA for Australian born females.  At the 1897 Castlemaine Conference a detailed report was provided that showed:
 168,757 native born women between the age of 15 and 40 years;
 an estimate of 109,000 women eligible to join a Society was given.
A motion to allow women to join the ANA was defeated.

The 1899 Port Fairy Conference heard that between the 1871 and 1891 censuses female primary income earners had increased from 52,243 to 114,804. In November 1899 the Board supported the creation of a Friendly Society for women. In August 1900 the Constitution and Bye Laws for the society were approved and registered in September.

In November the Australasian Women's Association (AWA) was formed.  The ANA absorbed all the expenses of setting up the Association.  The ANA and AWA worked closely together and at times jointly published document listing key office holder.

The changing circumstances after WW2 and the greater involvement of the Federal Government in providing social supports started to challenge Friendly Societies including the AWA. In 1955 the ANA began taking steps to enable AWA members to transfer to the ANA, this came to fruition in 1964.  A past AWA Chief President, Mrs. I. V. Meagher, became the first woman Chief President of the ANA in 1977.

White Australia policy
Alongside the Returned and Services League, the ANA was one of the last Australian groups to support the White Australia Policy. While this policy was wound down in the decades after the Second World War and totally abolished by 1970, a few members continued to support it until the 1970s.

Later years
The ANA continued to operate a private health fund, a building society, general insurance company and small-scale life insurance and fund management activities. In 1993, it merged those operations with Manchester Unity IOOF of Victoria to create Australian Unity, the largest friendly society in Australia by number of members.

In 2007, the Mosman Park WA Branch of the ANA closed down; the building owned by the chapter was sold and the proceeds distributed among the groups remaining 320 members.  The ANA continues though ANA Fraternal which is a continuation of the Metropolitan Committee.

References

Further reading 

  Kelleher, Bryan J. (compiler). Australian poetry and the Australian Natives' Association (South Melbourne: Australian Natives' Association, 1983)

1871 establishments in Australia
Australian Natives Association
Australian Natives' Association
Organizations established in 1871
Political organisations based in Australia
Anti-immigration politics in Australia
Australian nationalism